Okigwe is the third largest city in Imo state in Nigeria after Owerri and Orlu. Okigwe is located in the Okigwe Local Government Area  of Nigeria. The city lies between the Port Harcourt-Enugu-Maiduguri rail line, being the nearest city to the biggest cattle market in Nigeria located in the Umu Nneochi Area of Abia state. Thus, the city has grown into a major cattle transit town for the southeast and south subregions of Nigeria. Okigwe has a population of 132,237 (2005 census). Most of the population is made up of immigrant workers from other states. Okigwe city was the primary host site of the old Imo State University (now Abia State University). Okigwe has various tourist and historical sites. The Federal Government College in the city has remained one of the best unity schools in Nigeria. Okigwe remains one of the breadbaskets of Nigeria with terrace cultivation practised on its hilly farmlands.  Okigwe also boasts many relaxation spots such as Alexandra Suites & Hotels Limited Okigwe Imo state which is situated at No 1 Alexandra Ave, Umuchima Road, Ubahu. St. Mary's Cathedral in Okigwe is the seat of the Roman Catholic Diocese of Okigwe. In 2016, the Imo state government recommissioned a new cattle market in the city in respect to the previous one that has been relocated to Abia.

Autonomous communities and villages
Okigwe has six autonomous communities with different villages (in bracket) namely;

Ezinachi ( Ndiohia, Umudiaba, Amukwa, Amorie, Umuokparaoba, Amajarata, Obiohia, Umudo, Ndi Ngeleogwe, Umuebiri, Ubahu, Ajanumuna, Amachi, Umuike, Amachara, Umuoma, Umunuma, Umuoho,, Uhugbuala/Ndizorie, Ovoro/Umuagu 
Ikigwu (Aro-ubaha, Aro-Okigwe, Ope, Ubanaka, Umuka, Umuokpara),
Otanzu (Amaeze-Ogii, Umuawa-Ogee, Umualumoke), Amuro (Amuro, Aro-Amuro), 
Umulolo (Agbobu, Agbuala, Aku/Ihette, Aku/Ikenga, Amaosu, Amasator, Aro-Agbobu, Aro-Umulolo West, Aro-Umulolo East, Ibinta, Ndi-Oji, Ndi-Okoroji, Okanachi, Umuawa-Ibu) 
Ihube (Agbala, Akpugo, Amagu, Amalator, Amano, Nkoto, Ogube, Ozara)
Otan-Chara (Alaike-Ogwaku, Alaocha-Igwaku, Ihitte-Isiokwe, Ikenga, Ikenga-Isiokwe) umuinem, umuzegem, Umueze, Umukeoke

Agriculture and soil
The soil is predominantly partly red clay and black or dark brown. The major crops grown in the district on its hilly farmlands are palm trees (palm oil and palm wine), cassava, and vegetables.

See also
Roman Catholic Diocese of Okigwe

References

Local Government Areas in Imo State
Cities in Imo State
Local Government Areas in Igboland
Towns in Imo State